Llŷr or Llyr is a Welsh masculine given name. Notable people with the name include:

Llyr Gruffydd (born 1976), Welsh politician
Llŷr Ifans (born 1968), Welsh actor
Llŷr Williams (born 1976), Welsh concert pianist
Trystan Llŷr Griffiths (born ), Welsh tenor

Welsh masculine given names